Shispare is one of the high mountain peaks of the Batura Muztagh, the westernmost subrange of the Karakoram range in the Gilgit-Baltistan region of Pakistan.

Alternate forms of the name of this peak include Shispare Sar and Shisparé Sari.


Location

Shispare lies east of the Batura Wall, which is the highest part of the Batura Muztagh in Pakistan. 
The Hunza River curves around the southwest, west, and northwest sides of the Batura Muztagh, and Shispare towers above the western bank of the river. 
In turn, the Hunza Valley lies in the Hunza District of Gilgit-Baltistan, Pakistan.

Notable features
Shispare is notable for its tremendous rise above local terrain. For example, the nearby town of Karimabad, in the Hunza Valley,
Being near the end of the Batura
Muztagh, it commands large drops in three directions (north, east, and south). 
In addition, Shispare has a strikingly large and steep Northeast Face.

History

Climbing began in the Batura Muztagh later than in other parts of the Karakoram. Shispare was the first major peak in the range to be successfully climbed, in 1974, by the "Polish-German Academic Expedition" under the leadership of Janusz Kurczab. The ascent took 35 days, and during preparations for a second group to try for the summit, one member of the expedition (Heinz Borchers) was killed in an avalanche.

The first ascent route followed the Pasu Glacier to the East Ridge, between the Pasu and Ghulkin Glacier.
(Note: this ridge goes southeast from the summit, turns northeast, and then turns roughly east, so it is called the
"southeast ridge" and the "northeast ridge" in different sources.)
Difficulties included a long ice ridge, and the access to the ridge required 1500m of fixed rope.

The next attempt was in 1989 by members of the Ryukoku University Alpine Club in Japan, led by Masato Okamoto.

In 1994, a group from the Komono Alpine Club in Japan, led by Yukiteru Masui, achieved the second ascent of the peak. They reached Base Camp on June 18, and Masui, Kokubu, and Ozawa reached the summit on July 20. They followed the same route as the first ascent party and climbed in a similar style, with a similar amount of fixed rope.

The Himalayan Index lists no other ascents or attempts of this peak.

Climbing

The first (and second) ascent route is described above. It is likely that any other ascent route would involve (at least) similar difficulties, making this a highly challenging peak.

See also

 List of mountains in Pakistan

Books, pamphlets, and maps about Shispare
 High Asia: An Illustrated History of the 7000 Metre Peaks by Jill Neate, 
 Batura Mustagh (sketch map and pamphlet) by Jerzy Wala, 1988.
 Orographical Sketch Map of the Karakoram by Jerzy Wala, 1990. Published by the Swiss Foundation for Alpine Research.

Other references
 American Alpine Journal, 1975, pp. 215–216
 American Alpine Journal, 1990, pp. 294–295
 American Alpine Journal, 1995, pp. 295–296

External links

 Himalayan Index
 Microsoft Encarta Map of Shispare
 A clickable map of the Batura Muztagh
 A short entry in French about the first ascent.
 DEM files for the Himalaya (Corrected versions of SRTM data; Shispare is in the "Batura Sar" tile)
 Aerial Photos of Shispare by Brian McMorrow

Seven-thousanders of the Karakoram
Mountains of Gilgit-Baltistan